Shane Darryl Campbell is a Canadian Welterweight Muay Thai kickboxer, mixed martial artist, and a former W.K.A. Muay Thai World Champion. Campbell is also the current WMA World Pro Muay Thai Champion, Aggression MMA World Champion, and Unified MMA World Champion. Campbell is by far one of the most decorated Muay Thai fighters in North America and is also current W.M.A. Muay Thai Middleweight World Champion. Campbell currently holds the Lightweight title of the Unified Fighting Championship.

Biography/career
Born on January 21, 1987, Shane grew up in Hamilton, Ontario and started kickboxing at the age of 16. He had his first pro fight at 18, joining the Iron Tiger Muay Thai Gym under Romanian-Canadian Muay Thai Guru Kru Alin Hălmăgean in Stoney Creek, Ontario, but would continue to fight on both the professional and amateur circuits up until 2007.  Since 2008 Shane has increasingly become involved in mixed martial arts and has recently signed up with Aggression MMA having had some early success in the sport.

Campbell stopped Justin Greskiewicz in round one at the K-1 World Qualifying Tour 2013 in Calgary on June 8, 2013.

He stopped Wallace Lopes with a first round body kick at the K-1 World MAX 2013 World Championship Tournament Final 16 in Majorca, Spain on September 24, 2013.

He was scheduled to fight Maximo Suarez at the K-1 World MAX 2013 World Championship Tournament Quarter Finals - Part 2 in Gran Canria, Spain on January 11, 2014. However, he was then moved to the K-1 World MAX 2013 World Championship Tournament Quarter Finals - Part 1 in Foshan, China on December 28, 2013 and his opponent changed to Christopher Mena after the fight between Andy Souwer and Enriko Kehl from that card was cancelled (Souwer was unable to compete due to a bout of appendicitis while Kehl was moved to the January 11 event against Maximo Suarez due to suffering numerous cuts in fight with Buakaw Banchamek earlier in December). Campbell scored two knockdowns, one with a knee to the body in round two and one with a right hand at the end of round three, and won on points.

At the K-1 World MAX 2013 World Championship Tournament Final 4 in Baku, Azerbaijan on February 23, 2014, he lost to Enriko Kehl by UD in the semi-finals.

In March 2014, Campbell announced his intention to move up in weight to the -75 kg/165 lb division.

Championships and accomplishments

Martial arts
Aggression Fighting Championship
AFC Lightweight Championship (one time; former)
Unified MMA
 Unified MMA Welterweight Championship (one time; former)
 Unified MMA Catchweight Championship (one time; current)
 One successful title defense
 Unified MMA Lightweight Championship (one time; former)
 Two successful title defenses

Muay Thai
2013 WMC North American Muay Thai Champion
 2009 W.M.A. World Muay Thai champion
 2007 W.K.A. World Muay Thai Champion
 2007 W.M.F. World Championships  -71 kg
 2006 W.M.F. North American Muay Thai champion
 2006 W.K.A. North American Muay Thai Champion
 2005 I.U.K.A. Mid West American Muay Thai Champion
 C.A.M.T.A.O. Canadian Muay Thai Champion
 C.A.M.T.A.O. Ontario Muay Thai Champion

Mixed martial arts career

Early career
In addition to his kickboxing career, Campbell began competing professionally in mixed martial arts in 2008.  He competed primarily in regional organizations in his native Canada, including Aggression Fighting Championship and Maximum Fighting Championship before signing with the UFC in 2015.

Ultimate Fighting Championship
Campbell made his promotional debut as an injury replacement against John Makdessi on April 25, 2015 at UFC 186.  The bout was contested at a catchweight of 160 lbs. Campbell lost the fight via TKO in the first round.

Campbell faced Elias Silvério at UFC Fight Night 74 on August 23, 2015. He won the fight by unanimous decision.

Campbell faced James Krause on February 21, 2016 at UFC Fight Night 83. He lost the fight by unanimous decision.

Campbell next faced Erik Koch on May 29, 2016 at UFC Fight Night 88, filling in for an injured Joe Proctor. He lost the fight via submission in the second round.

Campbell next faced promotional newcomer Felipe Silva on August 27, 2016 at UFC on Fox 21. He lost the fight via TKO in the first round and was subsequently released from the promotion.

Post-UFC career
After his release, Campbell compiled a 8–2 record, fighting mostly in Unified MMA, where he has won and defended both Unified MMA Lightweight and Catchweight (165 lbs) Championships.

Campbell defended the Unified MMA Lightweight title against Hubert Geven on December 17, 2021 at Unified MMA 42. He won the bout via TKO in the second round.

Campbell faced Kyle Prepolec on March 4, 2022 at Unified MMA 43. He won the bout via unanimous decision.

Campbell defended his Unified MMA Super Lightweight belt against Darren Smith Jr. on December 16, 2022 at Unified MMA 48, winning the bout via fourth round rear-naked choke.

Mixed martial arts record

|-
| Win
| align=center|23-8
| Darren Smith Jr.
| Submission (rear-naked choke)
| Unified MMA 48
| 
| align=center|4
| align=center|2:15
| Toronto, Ontario, Canada
| 
|-
| Win
| align=center|22–8
| Kyle Prepolec
| Decision (unanimous)
| Unified MMA 43
| 
| align=center|3
| align=center|5:00
| Enoch, Alberta, Canada
| 
|-
| Win
| align=center|21–8
| Hubert Geven
| TKO (punches)
| Unified MMA 42
| 
| align=center|2
| align=center|2:33
| Enoch, Alberta, Canada
|
|-
| Win
| align=center|20–8
| Matt Krayco
| Decision (unanimous)
| Unified MMA 41
| 
| align=center|5
| align=center|5:00
| Edmonton, Alberta, Canada
|
|-
| Win
| align=center|19–8
| Dawond Pickney
| TKO (body kick and punches)
| Unified MMA 39: Campbell vs Pickney
| 
| align=center|2
| align=center|4:59
| Enoch, Alberta, Canada
|
|-
| Win
| align=center|18–8
| David Jordan
| Decision (unanimous)
| Z Promotions - Fight Night 11
| 
| align=center|3
| align=center|5:00
| Lethbridge, Alberta, Canada
|
|-
| Loss
| align=center|17–8
| Pavel Gordeev
| Decision (unanimous)
| Russian Cagefighting Championship 6
| 
| align=center|3
| align=center|5:00
| Chelyabinsk, Russia
|
|- 
| Win
| align=center|17–7
| Menad Abella
| Decision (unanimous)
| Unified MMA 36
| 
| align=center|3
| align=center|5:00
| Enoch, Alberta, Canada
| 
|-
|Loss
|align=center| 16–7
|Magomedsaygid Alibekov
|Decision (unanimous)
|Russian Cagefighting Championship 5
|
|align=center|3
|align=center|5:00
|Ekaterinburg, Russia
|
|-
|Win
|align=center| 16–6
|Stephen Beaumant
|Submission (neck crank)
|Unified MMA 33: Resurrection
|
|align=center|3
|align=center|3:31
|Enoch, Alberta, Canada
|
|-
|Win
|align=center| 15–6
|Mike Scarcello
|Submission (rear-naked choke)
|Unified MMA 32: Campbell vs Scarcello
|
|align=center|2
|align=center|4:01
|Edmonton, Alberta, Canada
|
|-
|Win
|align=center| 14–6
|Tristan Connelly
|Submission (kneebar)
|Unified MMA 31: Connelly vs. Campbell
|
|align=center|3
|align=center|4:54
|Edmonton, Alberta, Canada
|
|-
|Win
|align=center|13–6
|Jose Rodriguez
|TKO (body kick and punches)
|Unified MMA 30: Nybakken vs. Connelly
|
|align=center|3
|align=center|1:46
|Edmonton, Alberta, Canada
|
|-
|Loss
|align=center|12–6 
|Felipe Silva
|TKO (body punch)
|UFC on Fox: Maia vs. Condit
|
|align=center|1 
|align=center|1:13
|Vancouver, British Columbia, Canada
|  
|-
|Loss
|align=center|12–5
|Erik Koch
|Submission (rear-naked choke)
|UFC Fight Night: Almeida vs. Garbrandt
|
|align=center|2
|align=center|3:02
|Las Vegas, Nevada, United States
|  
|-
|Loss
|align=center|12–4
|James Krause
|Decision (unanimous)
|UFC Fight Night: Cowboy vs. Cowboy
|
|align=center|3
|align=center|5:00
|Pittsburgh, Pennsylvania, United States
| 
|-
|Win
|align=center|12–3
|Elias Silvério
|Decision (unanimous)
|UFC Fight Night: Holloway vs. Oliveira
|
|align=center|3
|align=center|5:00
|Saskatoon, Saskatchewan, Canada
|
|-
|Loss
|align=center|11–3
|John Makdessi
|TKO (punches)
|UFC 186
|
|align=center| 1
|align=center| 4:53
|Montreal, Quebec, Canada
|
|-
|Win
|align=center|11–2
|Derek Boyle
|TKO (body kick and punches)
|WSOF 18
|
|align=center| 3
|align=center| 0:31
|Edmonton, Alberta, Canada
|
|-
|Win
|align=center|10–2
|Marcus Edwards
|TKO (punches)
|MFC 41
|
|align=center| 2
|align=center| 0:29
|Edmonton, Alberta, Canada
|
|-
|Win
|align=center|9–2
|Jerrid Burke
|TKO (punches)
|MFC 40
|
|align=center| 2
|align=center| 0:43
|Edmonton, Alberta, Canada
|
|-
|Loss
|align=center|8–2
|Jesse Ronson
|Submission (rear-naked choke)
|AFC 19
|
|align=center| 2
|align=center| 1:59
|Edmonton, Alberta, Canada
|
|-
|Win
|align=center|8–1
|Stephen Beaumont 
|Submission (guillotine choke)
|AFC 14
|
|align=center| 1
|align=center| 2:50
|Edmonton, Alberta, Canada
|
|-
|Win 
|align=center|7–1
|Tim Smith 
|Submission (rear-naked choke) 
|Unified MMA 12 
| 
|align=center| 2
|align=center| 3:41
|Edmonton, Alberta, Canada 
|
|-
|Win 
|align=center|6–1
|Derek Boyle 
|Decision (unanimous) 
|Score Fighting Series 4 
| 
|align=center| 3 
|align=center| 5:00
|Hamilton, Ontario, Canada 
|
|-
|Win
|align=center|5–1
|Taylor Solomon 
|Decision (unanimous) 
|Global Warriors Fighting Championship 
| 
|align=center| 3 
|align=center| 5:00
|Hamilton, Ontario, Canada 
|
|-
|Loss 
|align=center|4–1
|Dave Mazany 
|Decision (unanimous) 
|AMMA 6: Edmonton
| 
|align=center| 3 
|align=center| 5:00
|Edmonton, Alberta, Canada 
|
|-
|Win 
|align=center|4–0
|Tony Hervey
|Decision (split) 
|Awada Combat Club: ERA Fight Night 
| 
|align=center| 3 
|align=center| 5:00
|Edmonton, Alberta, Canada 
|
|-
|Win 
|align=center|3–0
|Leo Constant 
|TKO (punches) 
|Heat XC 6: Bragging Rights 
| 
|align=center| 1 
|align=center| 0:34
|Edmonton, Alberta, Canada 
|
|-
|Win 
|align=center|2–0
|Sean Sivell
|KO (punches) 
|Iroquois: MMA Championship 5
| 
|align=center| 1 
|align=center| 2:36
|Brampton, Ontario, Canada 
|
|-
|Win 
|align=center|1–0
|Alain Sylvester
|Decision (unanimous)
|Iroquois: MMA Championship 4
| 
|align=center| 5
|align=center| 0:00
|Brampton, Ontario, Canada 
|
|-

Muay Thai and Kickboxing record

|-
|-  bgcolor="#FFBBBB"
|2014-02-23 || Loss || align=left| Enriko Kehl || K-1 World MAX 2013 World Championship Tournament Final 4, Semi Finals || Baku, Azerbaijan || Decision (unanimous) || 3 || 3:00
|-
|-  bgcolor="#CCFFCC"
|2013-12-28 || Win || align=left| Christopher Mena || K-1 World MAX 2013 World Championship Tournament Quarter Finals - Part 1, Quarter Finals || Foshan, China || Decision || 3 || 3:00
|-
|-  bgcolor="#CCFFCC"
|2013-09-14 ||Win || align=left| Wallace Lopes || K-1 World MAX 2013 World Championship Tournament Final 16, First Round || Majorca, Spain ||KO (liver kick) ||1 || 
|-
|-  bgcolor="#CCFFCC"
|2013-06-08 || Win || align=left| Justin Greskiewicz || K-1 World Qualifying Tour 2013 in Calgary || Calgary, AB || TKO || 1 || 
|-
|-  bgcolor="#CCFFCC"
|2013-03-02 || Win || align=left| Sean Mckinnon || Journey WMC || Calgary, AB ||Decision ||5 || 3:00
|-
! style=background:white colspan=9|
|-
|-  bgcolor="#CCFFCC"
| 2013-01-25 || Win ||align=left| Remy Bonnel || Lion Fight 8 || Las Vegas, NV ||Decision ||3 ||3:00
|-
|-  bgcolor="#CCFFCC"
| 2012-11-03 || Win ||align=left| Troy Sheridan || Journey Fight Series VIII || Calgary, AB ||Decision||5 || 3:00
|-
|-  bgcolor="#CCFFCC"
| 2012-06-09 || Win || align=left| Nate Chambers || Journey Fight Series VI  || Calgary, AB || KO (punches) || 1 || 1:56
|-
|-  bgcolor="#FFBBBB"
| 2010-07-? || Loss ||align=left| Pajonsuk || Enfusion Kickboxing Tournament, 2nd Round || Koh Samui, Thailand || Injury || 3 ||
|-
|-  bgcolor="#CCFFCC"
| 2010-07-? || Win ||align=left| Szűcs Barnabás || Enfusion Kickboxing Tournament, 1st Round || Koh Samui, Thailand || Decision || 3 || 3:00
|-
|-  bgcolor="#FFBBBB"
| 2009-09-12 || Loss ||align=left| Dmitry Valent || W.K.N. World GP Big-8 Tournament '09, Title Fight || Minsk, Belarus || Decision || 5 || 3:00
|-
|-  bgcolor="#FFBBBB"
| 2009-05-16 || Loss ||align=left| Joerie Mes || It's Showtime 2009 Amsterdam || Amsterdam, Netherlands || TKO (Ref Stop/3 Knockdowns) || 3 || 
|-
|-  bgcolor="#CCFFCC"
| 2009-01-17 || Win ||align=left| Farnam Mirzai || W.M.A. Gala || Mengzi City, China || TKO (Ref Stop) || 2 || 
|-
! style=background:white colspan=9 |
|-
|-  bgcolor="#CCFFCC"
| 2008-11-22 || win ||align=left| James Martinez || IQMMA VI-Iroquois MMA/MuayThai Championships || Ontario, Canada || TKO (elbow to the collarbone & knee to the body) || 1 || 2:34 
|-
|-  bgcolor="#FFBBBB"
| 2008-10-27 || Loss ||align=left| Dmitry Valent || W.M.C. I-1 World Grand Slam '08, Semi Finals || Hong Kong || Decision (Unanimous) || 3 || 3:00 
|-
|-  bgcolor="#FFBBBB"
| 2008-09-06 || Loss ||align=left| Warren Stevelmans || It's Showtime 2008 Alkmaar || Alkmaar, Netherlands || Decision || 3 || 3:00 
|-
|-  bgcolor="#CCFFCC"
|-2008-01-00 || win ||align=left| Thai Fighter || Chavang Stadium || Koh Saui, Thailand || KO || 2 || 2:00
|-
|-  bgcolor="#CCFFCC"
| 2008-08-15 || Win || align=left| Adam Higson || Gladiators Muay Thai & MMA || Manitoba, Canada || KO (right highkick) || 3 || 1:50
|-
|-  bgcolor="#CCFFCC"
| 2008-06-21 || win|| align=left| Alain Sylvestre || Iroquois - MMA Championships 4 || Ontario, Canada || Decision|| 5 || 3:00
|-
|- bgcolor="#FFBBBB"
| 2007-09-27 || Loss ||align=left| Chris Ngimbi || Combat Sports Challenge 22 "The Reckoning" || Richmond, VA, USA || Decision (Unanimous) || 5 || 3:00
|-
! style=background:white colspan=9 |
|-
|-  bgcolor="#CCFFCC"
|2007-05-12 || win || align=left| Trevor Smandich || Shin Do Kumite || Florida, USA || Decision || 5 || 3:00
|-
|-  bgcolor="#CCFFCC"
| 2007-03-24 || Win ||align=left| Chris Ngimbi || Combat Sports Challenge 19 || Richmond, VA, USA || Decision (Majority) || 5 || 3:00 
|-
! style=background:white colspan=9 |
|-
|-  bgcolor="#CCFFCC"
| 2006-12-08 || win || align=left| Michael Mananquil || Shin Do Kumate' XI - Battle of the Heavyweights   || Florida, USA || TKO (elbow) || 1 || 1:45 
|-
|-  bgcolor="#CCFFCC"
| 2006-09-03 || Loss ||align=left| Justin Greskiewicz || U.S.K.B.A. Action Sports World Championships || Rahway, NJ, USA || Decision || 3 || 3:00 
|-
! style=background:white colspan=9 |
|-
|-
|-  bgcolor="#CCFFCC"
| 2006-05-00 || Win ||align=left| Christian Endure || Fighting Spirit || Oneida Nation, Canada || KO || 3 ||
|-
|-  bgcolor="#CCFFCC"
| 2006-04-21 || Win ||align=left| Abdlamine El Khezzani || Friday Nights Fights || New York, NY, USA || TKO (Ref Stop/3 Knockdowns) || 1 || 
|-
|-|-  bgcolor="#CCFFCC"
| 2006-03-00 || Win ||align=left| Steve Rudinski || IUKA North American Title || Detroit, Michigan, USA || KO || 3 || 1:45
|-
! style=background:white colspan=9 |
|-
|-
| colspan=9 | Legend:    

|-  bgcolor="#FFBBBB"
| 2007-03-11 || Loss ||align=left| Vitaly Gurkov || W.M.F. Amateur Muaythai World Championships 2007, Final || Bangkok, Thailand || || ||
|-
! style=background:white colspan=9 |
|-
|-  bgcolor="#CCFFCC"
| 2007-03-08 || win ||align=left| Marcin Parcheta || W.M.F. Amateur Muaythai World Championships 2007, Semi Finals || Bangkok, Thailand || Walkover || N/A || N/A
|-
|-  bgcolor="#CCFFCC"
| 2007-03-07 || Win ||align=left| Alejandro Garcia || W.M.F. Amateur Muaythai World Championships 2007, Quarter Finals || Bangkok, Thailand || Decision || 4 || 2:00
|-
|-  bgcolor="#CCFFCC"
| 2007-03-06 || Win ||align=left| Mourad Bourachid || W.M.F. Amateur Muaythai World Championships 2007, 1st Round || Bangkok, Thailand || Decision || 4 || 2:00
|-
|-  bgcolor="#CCFFCC"
| 2006-12-17 || Win ||align=left| Justin Greskiewicz || WMF Junior Middleweight Muay Thai || USA || Decision (Unanimous) || 5 || 3:00 
|-
! style=background:white colspan=9 |
|-
| colspan=9 | Legend:

See also 
List of male kickboxers
List of K-1 events
List of It's Showtime events
List of Canadian UFC fighters

External links
Iron Tiger Muay Thai

References

Living people
1987 births
Canadian male kickboxers
Canadian male mixed martial artists
Lightweight mixed martial artists
Welterweight mixed martial artists
Mixed martial artists utilizing Muay Thai
Mixed martial artists utilizing Brazilian jiu-jitsu
Canadian Muay Thai practitioners
Canadian practitioners of Brazilian jiu-jitsu
Martial artists from Ontario
Sportspeople from Hamilton, Ontario
Welterweight kickboxers
Ultimate Fighting Championship male fighters